Heller is a surname. Notable people with the surname include:

 Ágnes Heller (1929–2019), Hungarian philosopher
 Amalia Heller (born 1951), Venezuelan television presenter and beauty pageant winner
 Amos Arthur Heller (1867–1944), American botanist
 André Heller (born 1947), Austrian artist, musician, entertainer
 André Heller (volleyball) (born 1975), Brazilian volleyball player
 Arnold Krumm-Heller (1876–1949), Gnostic archbishop
 Becca Heller, American human rights lawyer
 Ben Heller, American baseball player
 Bill Heller (1935–2020), American politician and educator
 Bruno Heller (born 1960), British television and film writer
 Camill Heller (1823–1917), Czech / Austrian zoologist
 Carlos Heller (born 1940), Argentine executive and politician
 Carol Heller, vocalist, guitarist: +44 (band)
 Craig Heller (physiologist), physiologist and biologist at Stanford University
 Craig Heller (writer), American television soap opera script writer
 Dean Heller (born 1960), American Senator
 Edmund Heller (1875–1939), American zoologist
 Eric J. Heller (born 1946), American theoretical chemist
 Erich Heller (1911–1990), European thinker and essayist
 Fanya Heller (1924–2017), Holocaust survivor
 George Heller, president and CEO of Hudson's Bay Company
 Guy Heller, vocalist (aka Dickie Moist): Moistboyz
 H. Robert Heller, economist, Governor of the Federal Reserve Board and CEO of Visa
 Hermann Heller (legal scholar) (1891–1933), German philosopher
 Hermann Heller (Swiss politician) (1850–1917)
 Isaac Heller (1926–2015), American toy manufacturer, co-founder of Remco
 Jean Heller, American journalist and writer
 Jerry Heller, music manager
 John R. Heller Jr., head of the U.S. National Cancer Institute in 1948-1960
 Josef Heller, Czechoslovakian luger
 Joseph Heller (1923–1999), author of Catch-22
 Joseph Heller (historian) (born 1937), Israeli historian
 Joseph Heller (zoologist) (born 1941), Israeli zoologist
 Karl Bartholomaeus Heller (1824–1880), Austrian botanist and naturalist
 Karl Borromaeus Maria Josef Heller (1864–1945), Austrian entomologist
 László Heller (1907–1980), Hungarian inventor
 Lisa Heller (born 1996), singer and songwriter
 Lukas Heller (1930–1988), screenwriter
 Marcel Heller (born 1986), German footballer
 Max Heller (1919–2011), Austrian refugee, American businessman, South Carolina politician
 Maximilian Heller (1860–1929), Czech-American rabbi
 Maxwell Elias Heller, American drag queen known as Miz Cracker
 Mervin Heller Jr., president, United States Tennis Association
 Meshullam Feivush Heller (1740s–1794), Hasidic author
 Michael Heller (law professor), law professor
 Michał Heller, scientist and priest
 Michał Heller (born 1936), Polish philosopher
 Pete Heller, English electronic and house music producer
 Rick Heller, American baseball coach
 Robert Heller (1826–1878), British magician
 Robert Heller (journalist) (1923–2010), British management journalist, consultant and author
 Seligmann Heller (1831–1890), Jewish Bohemian-Austrian poet and journalist
 Stanislav Heller (1924–2000), Czech harpsichordist
 Stephen Heller (1813–1888), Hungarian pianist, composer
 Steven Heller (design writer) (born 1950), American art director and journalist
 Steven Heller (music producer) (born 1949), American music composer and producer
 Tziporah Heller, Jewish studies educator, author, and speaker
 Walter E. Heller (1891–1969), financier
 Will Heller (born 1981), American football player
 Yom-Tov Lipmann Heller (1579–1654), rabbi
 Yosef Heller, American Jewish Orthodox rabbi
 Zoë Heller (born 1965), English journalist and novelist

See also 
 Geller (includes Russianised forms)
 Hiller (disambiguation)

German-language surnames
Jewish surnames
Surnames from nicknames